Ypsolopha angelicella is a moth of the family Ypsolophidae. It is known from the United States, including California.

The moth has a wingspan of 19–22 mm. Its antennae are white with sharp black annulations. The palpi, head and thorax are white and the shoulders yellowish. The forewings are white with striking fawn-brown ornamentation. The hindwings are shining ochreous white and the legs and underside of the body are white.

References

Ypsolophidae
Moths of North America